Couze-et-Saint-Front is a commune in the Dordogne department in Nouvelle-Aquitaine in southwestern France.

Population

See also
Communes of the Dordogne department

References

External links 

Communes of Dordogne